John S. Davidson Fine Arts Magnet School (DFA) is a public magnet school for the fine and performing arts located in downtown Augusta, Georgia, United States. It draws students in grades 6 through 12 throughout Richmond County. In addition to a basic curriculum of college preparatory and Advanced Placement academic courses, Davidson offers academic and fine arts courses in the areas of visual arts, music, chorus, dance, cinema production, and theatre. It has been recognized as a National Grammy Signature School, has been ranked as the #1 school in the state of Georgia, and has placed in the top 100 tier of Newsweeks "America's Best High Schools."

History
Davidson was founded in 1934 and named after John S. Davidson (1846-1894), an Augusta native, local educator, and Freemason leader. It was an elementary school from 1934 until 1981. In 1998, Davidson moved from its original site to a new campus one block away between 12th and 13th Street, Walton Way, and Telfair Street. Prior to this, the campus had been split across the original building, a converted police substation, several portable classrooms, and a renovated iron works building, spreading across three city blocks. At the time, it crossed the Augusta Canal's second level. Moving to the new location granted a view of the canal's third level.

The new location has a theater for art performances. Due to student demand, the original stained glass windows created by the class of 1983 were also moved to the new location. The school is within walking distance of historical landmarks in Augusta, including Sacred Heart Cultural Center and the Augusta Canal's first level.

Mascot
The original mascot for Davidson Fine Arts was the "Flaming Rainbow," due to every grade having a specific color.  When all the colors combined, they formed a rainbow symbolizing the unity, diversity, and creativity of Davidson. In 2006, after the success of their swimming team, the school administration created an official mascot for sporting competitions. In a school-wide vote, the mascot "Titan" was chosen.  Each grade is still represented by a color:
 6th grade — light green
 7th grade — light blue
 8th grade — orange
 9th grade — purple
 10th grade — green
 11th grade — blue
 12th grade — red
Each grade has a sister class with a similar color, with the exception of 9th grade, whose sister class was the lavender 5th grade class.

Admissions
Admission to Davidson is based upon grades and an audition to determine interest and aptitude in the fine arts. Middle school students audition in all of the fine arts areas and high school students are auditioned in up to two fine arts areas. Classes are admitted to Davidson by racial quotas (45% African American, 45% Caucasian, and 10% other).  Overall, there are on average about 700 students split equally among all classes.

Awards and recognition
During the 2004–05 school year and again in 2015, Davidson was recognized with the Blue Ribbon School Award of Excellence by the U.S. Department of Education, the highest award a U.S. school can receive.

The school has consistently been named as one of the best in the state of Georgia, and was named the number one academic school in the state each year from 1996 to 2009, a feat due almost exclusively to the high achievement of the students the school accepts.

The school is also known for its music program; the Davidson Fine Arts Chorale has been named among the best high school choral classes in the nation. In 2004, Grammy Foundation  selected Davidson as the Grammy Signature School, and granted the program $25,000.

Awards and recognitions include:
 Recognized as the #1 school in the state of Georgia consecutively through the 1996–2003 school years
 Recognized nationally as the 2004 National Grammy Signature School for its music programs
 Recognized for top SAT scores in the state of Georgia for the last ten years
 2003–2004: named a National Magnet School of Excellence
 Won first place in the 2004 State Literary Competition
 Won first place in the 2003 (Georgia) One Act Play Competition
 Ranked highest for excellence among magnet schools by the U.S. Department of Education for academic focus and integration of the fine arts
 Named a National Magnet School of Excellence for 2002–2003
 April 1996 issue of Redbook Magazine cited Davidson as one of 155 of the Nation's Best Schools as part of the America's Best Schools project.
 8 National Merit semifinalists and finalists since 1996
 22 Commended Merit Scholars since 1996
 10 National Achievement finalists and semifinalists since 1996
 25 Commended Achievement Scholars since 1996
 Recognized as a Georgia School of Excellence in 1995 
 First-place winner of the 2007 South Eastern Theater Conference
 First-place Orchestra at the 2004, 2005, 2006, and 2007 Fiestaval Competitions
 Semi-finalist at the 2006 Division AAA Georgia Academic Bowl
 Ranked among the top 1% of high schools by Newsweek
 First place winner of the 2007 Georgia Theater Conference (one of only two schools to win twice in a row)
 Received a gold medal and was ranked 84th best high school in the nation by U.S. News & World Report in 2007
 The 2005 GRAMMY Gold Signature School
 The Davidson Chorale selected as 2004 ACDA Southern Division Convention performer, Nashville, Tennessee
 The Davidson Chorale selected as 2005 ACDA National Convention performer, Los Angeles, California
 The Davidson Chorale selected as 2007 MENC Southern Division Convention performer, Charleston, South Carolina
 The Davidson Chorale selected as 2004, 2006, 2008, 2016 GMEA Convention performer, Savannah, Georgia, Athens, Georgia
 The Davidson Chorale selected as 2010 Georgia Music Educators Association In-Service Featured performer
 Ranked number 75 in Newsweeks "America's Best High Schools of 2011"
 Former student Garret Siler was the first magnet school student to play in professional basketball, as a center for the Phoenix Suns.

Clubs

 Academic Bowl
 Chess team
 Davidson Chorale
 Disc Golf Club
 Drama club
 The Environmental Club
 Golf team
 High school math club
 High school science club
 High school student council
 Improv Troupe
 International Thespian Society
 Intramurals
 Latin Club
 Middle school math club
 Middle school math team
 Middle school science club
 Middle school student council
 Middle school art club
 Model United Nations
 Mu Alpha Theta
 National Art Honor Society
 National English Honor Society
 National Junior Art Honor Society
 National Honor Society
 National Junior Honor Society
 Pennies for Peace Committee
 Poetry, fiction, and writing club
 Prom committee
 Spanish club
 Spectrum Players
 Swim team
 Tri-M
 USITT
 Yearbook staff
 Comedy club

Athletics
Davidson participates in several district competitive sports, among them track and field, golf, tennis, swimming, and volleyball. The school does not participate in the more traditional high school sports of football, basketball, and baseball.

Notable alumni

Notable Teachers/Faculty

See also

 Richmond County School System
 Augusta Downtown Historic District
 Arts and culture in Augusta, Georgia
 Artists' Row (Augusta, Georgia)

References

External links
 Davidson Fine Arts Magnet School
  The Davidson Chorale website

Schools of the performing arts in the United States
Educational institutions established in 1934
Universities and colleges accredited by the Southern Association of Colleges and Schools
High schools in Richmond County, Georgia
Magnet schools in Richmond County, Georgia
Middle schools in Richmond County, Georgia
Public high schools in Georgia (U.S. state)
Public middle schools in Georgia (U.S. state)
Magnet schools in Georgia (U.S. state)
1934 establishments in Georgia (U.S. state)